The 2019 SWAC women's basketball tournament took place March 12–16, 2019. Tournament first-round games were held on campus sites at the higher seed on March 12. The remaining rounds and the semifinals and championship at Bill Harris Arena in Birmingham, Alabama. The winner, Southern, received the Southwestern Athletic Conference's automatic bid to the 2019 NCAA Division I women's basketball tournament.

Unlike most NCAA Division I basketball conference tournaments, the SWAC tournament does not include all of the league's teams. The tournament instead features only the top eight teams from regular-season SWAC play.

Southern won the conference tournament championship game over Jackson State, 45–41.

Seeds

Bracket

**Denotes the number of overtimes played (double overtime)

See also
 2019 SWAC men's basketball tournament

External links
 2019 Toyota SWAC Tournament Brackets

References

SWAC women's basketball tournament
2018–19 Southwestern Athletic Conference women's basketball season